Stepnoy is a rural locality (a settlement) in Mglinsky District, Bryansk Oblast, Russia. The population was 6 as of 2010. There is 1 street.

Geography 
Stepnoy is located 18 km southeast of Mglin (the district's administrative centre) by road. Divovka is the nearest rural locality.

References 

Rural localities in Mglinsky District